Beilinson is a surname. Notable people with the surname include:

Alexander Beilinson (born 1957), Russian-American mathematician
Les Beilinson (1946–2013), American architect and preservationist

See also
The Beilinson Campus of the Rabin Medical Center, named after Moshe Beilinson

Jewish surnames